Marcus Cornelius Cethegus was a Roman statesman in the first half of the 2nd century BC. He was elected consul in 160 BC, in which position he served alongside Lucius Anicius Gallus. He drained the Pomptine Marshes and converted them into arable land.

In 171 BC he was sent as part of a commission into Cisalpine Gaul to determine why the consul Gaius Cassius Longinus had left his province. In 169 BC he was triumvir coloniae deducendae, an official charged with establishing a colony in Aquileia.

See also
 Cornelia gens

References

2nd-century BC Roman consuls
Cornelii Cethegi
Roman patricians